Dennis "Mo" Layton (born December 24, 1948) is a retired American professional basketball player. 

A 6'1" point guard from USC, Layton played five seasons (1971–1974, 1976–1978) in the National Basketball Association and American Basketball Association. His most productive season was his rookie year in 1972–73 with the Phoenix Suns, when he averaged 9.1 points, 3.1 assists and 2.1 rebounds in 23.1 minutes a game. Layton was waived by the Suns after two seasons, then signed with the Portland Trail Blazers, appearing in 22 games before being waived. He then signed with the Memphis Tams of the ABA, where he appeared in only 3 games. He would later sign with the Detroit Pistons prior to the 1974–75 NBA season, and again with the Suns prior to the 1975–76 NBA season, but was waived by both teams before the start of the respective season. Layton would return to the NBA in the 1976–77 and 1977–78 seasons, playing with the New York Knicks and the San Antonio Spurs, respectively. He was waived by the Spurs on October 2, 1978.

Statistics

Regular season

References

External links 
 

1948 births
Living people
All-American college men's basketball players
American men's basketball players
Basketball players from Newark, New Jersey
Memphis Tams players
New York Knicks players
Phoenix Bears men's basketball players
Phoenix Suns draft picks
Phoenix Suns players
Point guards
Portland Trail Blazers players
San Antonio Spurs players
USC Trojans men's basketball players
Weequahic High School alumni